Florian Milla Makongo Dinh (born 14 February 1994) is a French professional footballer who plays as a midfielder.

Career

In 2014, Milla signed for Czech side Mladá Boleslav from Saint-Étienne B. On 17 July 2014, he debuted for Mladá Boleslav during a 1–0 win over Vysočina.

In 2017, Milla signed for French club Andrézieux, where he suffered a ruptured cruciate ligament.

References

External links
 
 

1994 births
Living people
People from Saint-Priest-en-Jarez
French footballers
French sportspeople of Cameroonian descent
Association football midfielders
AS Saint-Étienne players
FK Mladá Boleslav players
Andrézieux-Bouthéon FC players
Les Herbiers VF players
Championnat National 2 players
Czech First League players
Championnat National 3 players
French expatriate footballers
Expatriate footballers in the Czech Republic
French expatriate sportspeople in the Czech Republic
Sportspeople from Loire (department)
Footballers from Auvergne-Rhône-Alpes